Patterson David Hood (born March 24, 1964) is an American singer-songwriter and co-founder of the band Drive-By Truckers.

Early life 
Hood was born in Muscle Shoals, Alabama, the son of Jan Patterson Adams and David Hood, the longtime bassist of the Muscle Shoals Rhythm Section. He has a younger sister, Lilla Hood. His parents married young, and divorced when he was in college. His mother later remarried. Hood wrote the song "18 Wheels of Love" about their relationship.

Hood began writing songs at the age of eight, and by the time he was 14 he was playing guitar in a local rock band. While attending college in 1985, he formed the band Adam's House Cat with his friend Mike Cooley, and the group won Musician Magazine'''s Best Unsigned Band competition three years later. However, the band's regional acclaim didn't translate into significant commercial success, and its sole full-length album wasn't released until September 21, 2018.

 Career 
After Adam's House Cat split up, Hood and Cooley continued to work together. They eventually formed the Drive-By Truckers in 1996, following a mutual relocation to Athens, Georgia. Drawing equal influence from country and rock & roll, the Drive-By Truckers released their first album, Gangstabilly, in 1998.

Hood has released three solo albums in his career, beginning with 2004's Killers and Stars on New West Records, followed by the self-released (on Ruth St. Records) Murdering Oscar (And Other Love Songs) in 2009 and 2012's Heat Lightning Rumbles in the Distance for ATO Records.

In 2012, Hood formed Patterson Hood and the Downtown 13 with Mike Mills of R.E.M., John Bell and Todd Nance of Widespread Panic, fellow Truckers Jay Gonzalez, Brad Morgan, John Neff and David Barbe, and Athens musicians Claire Campbell, Lera Lynn, Henry Barbe, Brannen Miles, Carter King and Payton Bradford. The collective was formed to record a track After It's Gone to protest the building of a new Wal-Mart in downtown Athens, GA. After It's Gone was released on 7" vinyl by ATO Records for Record Store Day 2012.

In 2020, Hood had a brief role in the film The Dark Divide.

 Personal life 
Hood has been married three times. He has two children and moved to Athens, Georgia in April 1994. Hood now lives with his family in Portland, Oregon, as he said in a July 2018 show in Omaha, Nebraska. In July 2015, Hood was featured in a New York Times editorial titled "The South’s Heritage Is So Much More Than a Flag" which discusses the misrepresentation of the history of the Confederate flag in the Southern United States.

 Discography 
 Solo albums 
Studio albumsKillers and Stars (2004)Murdering Oscar (And Other Love Songs) (2009)Heat Lightning Rumbles in the Distance (2012)

 Patterson Hood and the Downtown 13 
SinglesAfter It's Gone (2012)

 Drive-By Truckers 
Studio albums
 Gangstabilly (1998)
 Pizza Deliverance (1999)
 Southern Rock Opera (2001)
 Decoration Day (2003)
 The Dirty South (2004) No. 147 US
 A Blessing and a Curse (2006) No. 50 US
 Brighter Than Creation's Dark (2008) No. 37 US
 The Big To-Do (2010) No. 22 US, No. 61 UK
 Go-Go Boots (2011) No. 35 US No. 58 UK
 English Oceans (2014)
 American Band (2016)
 The Unraveling (2020)
 The New OK (2020)
 Welcome 2 Club XIII (2022)

Live albums
 Alabama Ass Whuppin' (2000)
  Live From Austin, TX (2009)
 Live at Third Man (2011)
 It's Great To Be Alive! (2015)

Collections
 The Fine Print: A Collection of Oddities and Rarities (2009)
 Ugly Buildings, Whores, and Politicians: Greatest Hits 1998-2009'' (2011)

Singles
 "Bulldozers and Dirt"/"Nine Bullets" (1996)
 "Never Gonna Change" (2004)
 "Aftermath USA" (2006)
 "A Blessing and a Curse" (2006)
 "Self-Destructive Zones" (2008)
 "A Ghost to Most" (2008)
 "The Righteous Path" (2008)
 "This Fucking Job" (2010, retitled "Working This Job" for radio and music video channels)
 "Your Woman Is A Livin' Thing"/"Just Maybe" (2010)
 "The Thanksgiving Filter"/"Used To Be A Cop" (2010)

References

External links 

 
 

University of North Alabama alumni
Musicians from Georgia (U.S. state)
Musicians from Alabama
Living people
1964 births
People from Muscle Shoals, Alabama
Songwriters from Alabama
Drive-By Truckers members
Songwriters from Georgia (U.S. state)
ATO Records artists
New West Records artists